Mona Lisa is a 1986 British neo-noir crime drama film about an ex-convict who becomes entangled in the dangerous life of a high-class call girl. The film was written by Neil Jordan and David Leland, and directed by Jordan. It was produced by HandMade Films and stars Bob Hoskins, Cathy Tyson, and Michael Caine.

The film was nominated for multiple awards, and Bob Hoskins was nominated for several awards for his performance (including the Academy Award for Best Actor), winning the Golden Globe Award for Best Actor – Motion Picture Drama and BAFTA Award for Best Actor in a Leading Role.

Plot
George, a low-level working-class gangster recently released after seven years in prison, is given a job in London by his former boss, Denny Mortwell, as the driver and bodyguard for a high-priced prostitute named Simone. Mortwell also wants George to gather information on one of Simone's wealthy customers for blackmail purposes. Simone, who has worked hard to develop high-class manners and an elite clientele, initially dislikes the uncouth and outspoken George, and he regards her as putting on airs. But as George and Simone find out more about each other, they form a friendship, and George begins to fall in love with her. George agrees, at the risk of his own life, to help Simone find her teenage friend Cathy, who has disappeared, and who Simone fears is being abused by her violent former pimp, Anderson.

George increasingly finds himself torn between his feelings for Simone, his obligations to his boss Mortwell, and his relationship with his teenage daughter Jeannie, a sweet normal girl who has matured while he was in prison and wants to have her father in her life.

After Anderson tries to slash Simone and attacks George, Simone flees to Brighton. George finally finds Cathy and takes her to Brighton to reunite her with Simone, where he lends Simone a gun. He discovers that Simone and Cathy are lovers. Mortwell and Anderson arrive to take back control of Simone and Cathy, but Simone shoots them both dead and turns her gun towards George. He punches her, takes the gun and leaves. Freed of his underworld obligations, George returns to a more normal life, working in his friend Thomas's garage and spending time with Jeannie.

Cast

Reception
The film received positive critical reception when released in 1986. Film critic Roger Ebert wrote of the two main characters "The relationship of their characters in the film is interesting, because both people, for personal reasons, have developed a style that doesn't reveal very much." However, Vincent Canby, writing for The New York Times, dismissed the film as "classy kitsch." Halliwell's Film Guide argued "only this actor could make a hit of this unsavoury yarn, with its highlights of sex and violence. But he did."

Bob Hoskins was praised for his performance and was awarded the Golden Globe Award, BAFTA Award, Prix d'interprétation masculine at the Cannes Film Festival, and other awards. Despite this heavy acclaim, he lost the Academy Award for Best Actor to Paul Newman in The Color of Money.

On Rotten Tomatoes, Mona Lisa holds a 97% approval rating from 36 reviews, with an average rating of 8.1/10.

Awards and nominations

See also
 BFI Top 100 British films
 Trinity Court, Gray’s Inn Road, film location

References

External links
 
 
 
 
 
 Essay by Neil Jordan at the Criterion Collection
 

1986 films
1986 crime drama films
1986 LGBT-related films
British crime drama films
British LGBT-related films
Films about prostitution in the United Kingdom
Films directed by Neil Jordan
Films scored by Michael Kamen
Films featuring a Best Drama Actor Golden Globe winning performance
Films set in Brighton
Films set in London
HandMade Films films
Murder in films
1980s English-language films
1980s British films